Potassium tellurite, K2TeO3, is an inorganic potassium-tellurium compound. It has been used as a selective growth medium in microbiology.

References

Tellurites
Potassium compounds